John Fearnley (born 13 September 1968) is an Australian former professional rugby league footballer who played in the 1990s.  He played for the Parramatta Eels, and South Sydney in the New South Wales Rugby League (NSWRL) competition.

Playing career
Fearnley made his first grade debut for Parramatta in Round 3 of the 1991 season against Norths.  Fearnley went on to make 76 appearances for Parramatta before switching to Souths.  Fearnley went on to make only 3 appearances for South Sydney before retiring at the end of the 1995 season.

References

1968 births
Living people
Australian rugby league players
Parramatta Eels players
Rugby league players from Bathurst, New South Wales
Rugby league props
South Sydney Rabbitohs players